Simple Pleasures may refer to:

 Simple Pleasures (Alison Brown album), 1990
 Simple Pleasures (Bobby McFerrin album), 1988
 Simple Pleasures, Nancy Wilson discography
 Simple Pleasure, a 1999 album by Tindersticks
 Simple Pleasures (Shameless), TV episode